WLBI-LP (107.1 FM) is a radio station broadcasting a religious format as an affiliate of Radio 74 Internationale. Licensed to Tomahawk, Wisconsin, United States, the station is currently owned by Above and Beyond Broadcasting, Inc.

References

External links
 
 

LBI-LP
LBI-LP
Radio 74 Internationale radio stations
2008 in Wisconsin
Radio stations established in 2008
Lincoln County, Wisconsin